LINE-1 type transposase domain containing 1 pseudogene 1 is a protein that in humans is encoded by the L1TD1P1 gene.

References